A hammer is a type of tool.

Hammer or HAMMER may also refer to:

Entertainment

Film and television
 Hammer Film Productions, also known as Hammer Films, a British film and television production company based in London, United Kingdom
 Hammer (film), a 1972 action film starring Fred Williamson
 The Hammer (2007 film), a comedy starring Adam Carolla
 The Hammer (2010 film), a biopic about deaf wrestler and mixed martial artist Matt Hamill
 "The Hammer" (Justified), a 2010 episode of the TV series Justified
 The Hammer, an episode of a Canadian podcast called Someone Knows Something

Music
 "Hammer" (song), by Bob Marley
 Hammer (album), by Afrob
 "The Hammer", a song from the album Ace of Spades by Motorhead
 "The Hammer", a 1986 song by David Rudder
 "The Hammer", a 1994 Christian song by Ray Boltz
Hammer, a 2013 album by Claw Boys Claw 
 "hammer", a 2018 song by Nothing,Nowhere
 "Mahler hammer", hammer used as percussion instrument in Mahler's 6th Symphony in A minor

Fictional characters
 Hammer (comics), Marvel Comics characters
 Mike Hammer (character), a private detective created by Mickey Spillane
 Justin Hammer, Marvel Comics supervillain
 Sasha Hammer, a Marvel Comics enemy of Iron Man
 Colonel Alois Hammer, a mercenary in David Drake's Hammerverse
 Hans von Hammer, a World War I fighter ace in Enemy Ace, a DC Comics property
 Sgt. Hammer, the siege tank operator, a playable character in Heroes of the Storm
 Alter ego of the Crimson Cowl, a Marvel Comics villain
 Half of the Marvel Comics supervillain team Hammer and Anvil

Other
 H.A.M.M.E.R., a fictional espionage and law enforcement agency in the Marvel Comics Universe

Military and firearms
 FOB Hammer, a now-closed U.S. military forward operating base in Iraq
 Hammer (firearms), a gun part used to fire the projectile
 Highly Agile Modular Munition Extended Range (HAMMER), also known as Armement Air-Sol Modulaire (AASM), a French kit for upgrading dumb bombs to rocket-powered smart bombs
 Operation Hammer (disambiguation), several military (and one police) operations
 War hammer, a medieval weapon

People
 Hammer (surname), a list of people with the surname
 Hammer (nickname), a list of people
 Hammer DeRoburt (1922–1992), the founding President of the Republic of Nauru
 MC Hammer (born 1962), American rapper and actor
 Van Hammer (born 1967), ring name of an American former professional wrestler
 William Hinds (1887–1957), stage name Will Hammer, co-founder of Hammer Films

Places

Germany
 Hammer an der Uecker, in Uecker-Randow
 A locality in Wipperfürth
 A locality in Liebenwalde
 A locality in Simmerath
 A locality in Fischbachau
 An administrative area in Feldkirchen-Westerham
 A former name of Herchen-Bahnhof, a locality in Windeck

Elsewhere
 Hammer, West Sussex, England
 Hammer, South Dakota, United States
 Hammer Creek, Pennsylvania, United States
 Hammer Lake, Ontario, Canada
 Hammer Point, Robert Island, Antarctica
 The Hammer, nickname of Hamilton, Ontario, the 10th largest city in Canada
 The former German name of a Prussian village that is now Bogucin, Poland
 Hammer or Hamre (municipality), a former municipality in Hordaland, Norway

Sports
 Hammer throw, an athletic event
 The last stone advantage in curling
 PFC Minyor Pernik, a Bulgarian football team known as The Hammers
 West Ham United F.C., an English football team known as The Hammers
 West Ham Hammers, a defunct English motorcycle speedway team
 Lakeside Hammers, an English speedway team
 Hammer SpVg, a German association football club
 Alabama Hammers, a Professional Indoor Football League team
 Huntington Hammer, an Ultimate Indoor Football League team based in Huntington, West Virginia

Technology
 HAMMER (file system), a file system in DragonFly BSD
 Hammer (telecommunication), test system by Empirix
 A development phase of the Athlon 64 microprocessor
 A development phase of the Glaze3D graphic card series
 Hammer Editor, a 3D level editor for Source and GoldSrc maps
 HAMR, acronym for heat-assisted magnetic recording
 Hammer, to subject a system to a brute-force attack

Other 
 Hammer (American automobile), built in Detroit, Michigan, by the Hammer Motor Company from 1905 to 1906
 Hammer (Australian automobile), a cyclecar built in Mount Torrens, South Australia by Bruno Hammer
 Hammer (candlestick pattern), a formation in stock market analysis
 HAMMER (spacecraft), a NASA-proposed nuclear spacecraft
 Hammer Bowling, an American bowling equipment manufacturer
 Hammer Museum or Armand Hammer Museum of Art and Culture Center at UCLA, Los Angeles, California
 Hammer projection, an equal area map projection
 Hammer Stradivarius, a 1707 antique violin
 , a Singaporean tanker
 "Hammer" was a nickname for a late-1980s Mercedes-Benz car tuned by AMG
 Malleus, a bone in the middle ear

See also
 Jackhammer (disambiguation)
 Charles Martel (c. 688–741), Frankish king - Martel is French for "the hammer"
 Judas Maccabeus, leader of the Maccabean revolt (167–160 BCE) against the Seleucid Empire - Maccabee may derive from the Aramaic word for "hammer"
 Edward I of England (1239–1307), King of England, "Hammer of the Scots"
 
 Hamar (disambiguation)
 Hummer (disambiguation)